This is a list of airport museums in the United States. These are museums that are located inside an airport terminal building, NOT those that are located simply at an airport.

By state

Arizona
Phoenix Airport Museum at the Phoenix Sky Harbor International Airport, Phoenix

California
Aviation Museum of Santa Paula at the Santa Paula Airport, Santa Paula
SFO Museum at the San Francisco International Airport, San Francisco
Flight Path Museum & Learning Center at Los Angeles International Airport Imperial Terminal, Los Angeles, California   http://www.flightpathmuseum.com

Florida
Airport Museum at the Melbourne International Airport, Melbourne

Maryland
College Park Aviation Museum at the College Park Airport, College Park

Nevada
Howard W. Cannon Aviation Museum at the McCarran International Airport, Paradise

North Carolina
Dare County Regional Airport Museum at the Dare County Regional Airport, Manteo

Ohio
International Women's Air & Space Museum at the Burke Lakefront Airport, Cleveland

Wisconsin
 Mitchell Gallery of Flight at the Milwaukee Mitchell International Airport, Milwaukee

See also
List of aerospace museums
List of museums in the United States

References

Museums
Airport
Airport
Museums Airport